This is a list of radio stations in Malta.

References

Malta
Radio stations